Charles Bauer (26 February 1904 – 22 June 1975) was a French cinematographer.

Selected filmography
 Ciboulette (1933)
 The Lie of Nina Petrovna (1937)
 Barnabé (1938)
 Pierre and Jean (1943)
 Night Warning (1946)
 The Last Penny (1946)
 Song of the Clouds (1946)
 Destiny Has Fun (1947)
 Counter Investigation (1947)
 Night Express (1948)
 The Dancer of Marrakesh (1949)
 Moumou (1951)
 Sins of Madeleine (1951)
 The Nude Dancer (1952)
 The Red Head (1952)

References

Bibliography
 Phillips, Alastair. City of Darkness, City of Light: Émigré Filmmakers in Paris, 1929-1939. Amsterdam University Press, 2004.

External links

1904 births
1975 deaths
Cinematographers from Paris